FashionUnited is an international B2B fashion platform created in 1999 by Lennard Minderhoud, current CEO of the company.

History
The idea of founding FashionUnited came to Lennard Minderhoud in the late 1990s after he realized that “there was little information about fashion on the internet.”  The platform offers fashion news, fashion jobs, the statistics of the industry and a Fashion Education Network created in 2010.  Fashion Week Web, created at the end of 2014, also part of FashionUnited, offers all the fashion week’s news around the world. The headquarter of FashionUnited is located in Amsterdam, Netherlands.

The platform is active in more than 25 countries and the website is available in 16 languages. FashionUnited reaches more than 1.6 million fashion professionals per month.

List of the countries where FashionUnited is active:

In the second half of 2014, FashionUnited changed its logo and redesigned all the  FashionUnited websites.

In November 2014, FashionUnited.co.uk switched from co.uk to the shorter and sharper .uk domain “FashionUnited.uk”. Lennard Minderhoud, CEO of FashionUnited, declared “FashionUnited.co.uk was affected by the design changes so we decided to switch to .uk. It not only gave the website a ‘pretty new face’ but also enabled us to adopt the safer https format at the same time.”

FashionUnited expanded its activities in The Americas. First, in October 2014, the platform debuted in Latin America by opening five new portals: Argentina, Chile, Colombia, Mexico and Peru. In December 2014, the company stepped up its activity in United States with the hire of new specialized editors and HR consultants dedicated to the American market.  Beginning of 2015, FashionUnited launched the Canadian portal, offered in both the English and French language to fits the need of the Canadian population. In February 2015, the fashion platform celebrated this expansion with a billboard ad in New York Times Square.

Partnerships
FashionUnited partners with the following fashion events:
 48h Maison de Mode
 Amsterdam Fashion Week
 Barcelona Bridal Week
 Baton Rouge Fashion Week
 Birmingham International Fashion Week
 Brussels Fashion Days
 Cartagena Fashion Week
 Cologne Fashion Days
 Couture Fashion Week
 Dot to Dot London
 Dutch Fashion Symposium
 European Bridal Week
 Fiji Fashion Week
 Film Fashion Festival
 LaJolla Fashion Week
 London Bridal Fashion Week
 Men’s Fashion Week Dallas
 Norwich Fashion Week 
 Vancouver Fashion Week
 Premium
 Pure London 
 Tampa Bay Fashion 
 Vendôme Luxury
 Western Canada Fashion Week

References

External links 
 Official website

Dutch news websites
Fashion websites
1999 establishments in the Netherlands